Kim Wan-sun (Hangul: 김완선, Hanja: 金緩宣; born May 16, 1969) is a South Korean pop singer who was known in the mid-1980s and early 1990s as the "Korean Madonna" and "the dancing queen of Korean popular music's renaissance era" as well as a sex symbol for her "sexy" dancing and "charismatic" stage presence.

Kim debuted in 1986 with the album, Tonight. Her fifth album, 1990's Pierrot Smiles at Us, sold 1 million copies. She is considered to be one of the first wave of Hallyu artists due to her success in Taiwan in the mid-1990s.

Early life 
Kim Wan-sun was born Kim I-sun on May 16, 1969, the third of her parents' five daughters. When she was in middle school, Kim began training to be a singer and dancer under the guidance of her aunt, Han Baek-hee, who managed successful musicians including the singer Insooni. Han rigorously trained Kim for three years, during which time Kim dropped out of school and did not visit her parents.

Discography

Studio albums

Compilation albums

Extended plays

Digital singles & EP

Filmography

Film

Television show

References

1969 births
K-pop singers
Living people
Korean Mandopop singers
South Korean female idols
South Korean women pop singers
University of Hawaiʻi alumni
20th-century South Korean women singers
21st-century South Korean women singers
South Korean expatriates in Taiwan